The FAP 1118 is a series of 4x4 military trucks manufactured by Fabrika automobila Priboj (FAP), based on the Mercedes-Benz NG series. The FAP 1118 is intended to replace the TAM 110 series of military trucks in the Serbian Armed Forces.

Description
Its prototype was completed and tested and a trial lot is scheduled for realization by the end of this year. It is designed for transport of personnel, weapons and material of up to 4t gross weight, as well as for towing of artillery pieces and trailers. Equipped with all-wheel drive, locking of all differentials and powerful diesel engine, the vehicle is able to negotiate cross-country gradients of 60%. Central regulation of tire pressure ensures high mobility over soft soil and its well thought out body geometry enables easy negotiating of natural and man-made obstacles such as trenches, railway embankments, escarpments etc. There are a few different variants of truck as it is used for several different upgrades (Sanijet NBC, LRSVM Morava etc.).

Technical specifications

1118 BS/36 4x4
Gross vehicle mass: 11,000 kg
Front axle permissible mass: 5200 kg
Rear axle permissible mass: 5800 kg
Payload: 4000 kg
Engine type: Mercedes-Benz OM 904 LA, EU3
Configuration: Straight-four diesel engine
Bore/stroke: 102/130 mm
Displacement: 4.25 dm3
Rated power: 130 kW at 2200 min−1
Peak torque: 675 N·m at 1200-1600 min−1
Electrical system: 24 V
Clutch: GF 380
Gearbox: FAP 6MS 60-P 98
Front axle: AL 3/1 DS
Rear axle:  HL4/36 DS- 9.2
Steering system: PPT 8042
Length × width × height: 4000 × 2430 × 1700 mm
Wheel size: 9,00 - 22,5″
Tyre size: 13R 22,5″ HSO MIL
Fuel tank capacity: 200 l
Max. speed: 80 km/h
Max. grading: 60 %

References

Military trucks
1118
All-wheel-drive vehicles
Military vehicles introduced in the 2010s
Military vehicles of Serbia